King Biscuit Flower Hour Presents Ringo & His New All-Starr Band is a live album by Ringo Starr released on 6 August 2002.

Overview
Starr's All-Starr Band was always evolving. While Mark Rivera remained from the previous band, the new players for the 2001 US tour here include Emerson, Lake & Palmer's Greg Lake, Mott the Hoople's Ian Hunter and - bringing a more updated sound to the precedings - Supertramp's Roger Hodgson, Howard Jones and former Prince bandmember Sheila E. Starr naturally has the biggest share of the songs, performing his classic hits from the 1960s and 1970s - with the relatively recent "Don't Go Where the Road Don't Go" from 1992's Time Takes Time, with all his celebrity guests each having their moment in the spotlight.

Reception
King Biscuit Flower Hour Presents Ringo & His New All-Starr Band was fairly well received by the critics upon its August 2002 release, though again, it failed to reach the charts.

Track listing

Personnel 

 Greg Lake – bass, vocals, acoustic guitar
 Howard Jones – keyboards, vocals
 Ian Hunter – guitar, vocals, piano
 Roger Hodgson – guitar, vocals, piano
 Sheila E. – drums, percussion, vocals
 Mark Rivera – saxophone, guitar, bass, keyboard, harmonica, flute, percussion, vibraslap, backing vocals, musical director

References
 Footnotes

 Citations

2002 live albums
Ringo Starr live albums
Albums produced by Ringo Starr